Events from the year 1977 in Canada.

Incumbents

Crown 
 Monarch – Elizabeth II

Federal government 
 Governor General – Jules Léger
 Prime Minister – Pierre Trudeau
 Chief Justice – Bora Laskin (Ontario)
 Parliament – 30th

Provincial governments

Lieutenant governors 
Lieutenant Governor of Alberta – Ralph Steinhauer  
Lieutenant Governor of British Columbia – Walter Stewart Owen 
Lieutenant Governor of Manitoba – Francis Lawrence Jobin 
Lieutenant Governor of New Brunswick – Hédard Robichaud
Lieutenant Governor of Newfoundland – Gordon Arnaud Winter 
Lieutenant Governor of Nova Scotia – Clarence Gosse  
Lieutenant Governor of Ontario – Pauline Mills McGibbon
Lieutenant Governor of Prince Edward Island – Gordon Lockhart Bennett 
Lieutenant Governor of Quebec – Hugues Lapointe 
Lieutenant Governor of Saskatchewan – George Porteous

Premiers 
Premier of Alberta – Peter Lougheed  
Premier of British Columbia – Bill Bennett 
Premier of Manitoba – Edward Schreyer (until November 24) then Sterling Lyon 
Premier of New Brunswick – Richard Hatfield
Premier of Newfoundland – Frank Moores
Premier of Nova Scotia – Gerald Regan  
Premier of Ontario – Bill Davis 
Premier of Prince Edward Island – Alexander B. Campbell 
Premier of Quebec – René Lévesque
Premier of Saskatchewan – Allan Blakeney

Territorial governments

Commissioners 
 Commissioner of Yukon – Arthur MacDonald Pearson 
 Commissioner of Northwest Territories – Stuart Milton Hodgson

Events
January 1 - Canada's offshore exclusive economic zone is extended to 200 nautical miles (370 km).
January 26 – Katimavik is founded as a volunteer service organization for Canadian youths.
February 6 – Silver Jubilee of Elizabeth II's accession as Queen of Canada
February 6 - René Lévesque is embroiled in scandal after he, while driving in a car with a woman who is not his wife, hits and kills a homeless man.
February 27 - Royal Canadian Mounted Police raid Keith Richards's Toronto hotel suite while he is sleeping and seize 22 grams of heroin, 5 grams of cocaine, and narcotics paraphernalia.
February 28 - Canadian passenger rail services are amalgamated into Via Rail.
March 30 - CFVO-TV was shut down due to the Cinérotique controversy.
May 5 - Willie Adams becomes the first Inuk to enter Parliament when he is appointed to the Senate.
May 9 - The final report of the Mackenzie Valley Pipeline Inquiry is released.
June: Elizabeth II tours Canada as part of her Silver Jubilee goodwill tour.
June 9 - Ontario election: Bill Davis's PCs win a second consecutive minority.
June 24 — Social Credit leader André-Gilles Fortin is killed in a car accident.
July 28 – Emanuel Jaques, 12, is abducted after being lured into an apartment building under false pretenses on Yonge Street in downtown Toronto. His strangled body is found several days later under a pile of wood on the building's rooftop. Four men are apprehended for the crime.
August 26 - The Charter of the French Language is passed by the Parti Québécois.
September 3 - September 5 - All Canadian road signs are converted to metric units.
October 18 - Deliberations of the House of Commons are televised for the first time making Canada an early country to broadcast the proceedings of one body of its national legislature.
November 21 - Gerald Hannon's controversial article "Men Loving Boys Loving Men" is published in The Body Politic
November 24 - Sterling Lyon becomes premier of Manitoba, replacing Edward Schreyer.

Full date unknown
The Eaton Centre opens in Toronto.
Focus Corporation, a project delivery company is founded.
Prime Minister Trudeau separates from his wife Margaret Sinclair.
Quebec becomes the first jurisdiction (larger than a city or county) in the world to prohibit discrimination in the public and private sectors based on sexual orientation.
Etobicoke introduces the Reduce Impaired Driving in Etobicoke programme which, eventually, spreads across the province as Reduce Impaired Driving Everywhere.

Arts and literature

New works
Margaret Atwood: Dancing Girls
Elizabeth Smart: A Bonus
Timothy Findley: The Wars
Irving Layton: The Covenant
Roch Carrier: Il n'ya pas de pays sans grand-père
Gabrielle Roy: Ces Enfants de ma vie
Morley Callaghan: Close to the Sun Again
Antonine Maillet: La Veuve enragée
Marshall McLuhan: City as Classroom: Understanding Language and Media

Awards
See 1977 Governor General's Awards for a complete list of winners and finalists for those awards.
Books in Canada First Novel Award: Michael Ondaatje, Coming Through Slaughter
Stephen Leacock Award: Ray Guy, That Far Greater Bay
Vicky Metcalf Award: James Archibald Houston

Sport
March 13 – The Toronto Varsity Blues win their eighth University Cup by defeating the Alberta Golden Bears 4–1. The final game was played at Northlands Coliseum in Edmonton
April 7 – The Toronto Blue Jays become Major League Baseball's second Canadian team, when they defeat the Chicago White Sox in a game played at Exhibition Stadium in Toronto
May 14 – The Montreal Canadiens win their 20th Stanley Cup by defeating the Boston Bruins 4 games to 0. Thurso, Quebec's Guy Lafleur was awarded the Conn Smythe Trophy
May 14 – The New Westminster Bruins win their first Memorial Cup by defeating the Ottawa 67's 6 to 5. The final game was played Pacific Coliseum in Vancouver
May 26 – The Quebec Nordiques win their first Avco Cup by defeating the Winnipeg Jets 4 games to 3. The deciding Game 7 was played at the  Colisée de Québec
July 16 – Gilles Villeneuve makes his Formula One debut, with Team McLaren, at the British Grand Prix. He is the first Canadian driver in the top formula.
November 19 – The Western Ontario Mustangs win their fourth (second consecutive) Vanier Cup by defeating the Acadia Axemen  48–15 in the 13th Vanier Cup played at Varsity Stadium in Toronto
November 27 – The Montreal Alouettes win their fourth Grey Cup by defeating the Edmonton Eskimos in a game played at Olympic Stadium in Montreal. Vancouver's Don Sweet won his second Most Valuable Canadian award and London, Ontario's Glen Weir won the game's Defensive MVP award.

Births

January to March
January 1 - Jacinthe Taillon, synchronised swimmer
February 11 - Stephanie Richardson, swimmer
February 20 - Gail Kim, wrestler
March 3 - Stéphane Robidas, ice hockey player
March 6 - Reagan Pasternak, actress
March 13 - Barney Williams, rower and Olympic silver medalist
March 27 - Buffy-Lynne Williams, rower and Olympic bronze medalist
March 28 - Trevor Stewardson, boxer

April to June
April 5 - Zach Whitmarsh, track and field athlete
April 21 - Jamie Salé, pair skater, Olympic gold medalist and World Champion
April 26 - Craig Adams, ice hockey player
May 4 - Emily Perkins, actress
May 9 - Michelle Fournier, hammer thrower
May 12 - Rachel Wilson, actress 
May 13 - Christopher Ralph, actor
May 16 - Jean-Sébastien Giguère, ice hockey player
May 19 
 Claire Carver-Dias, synchronised swimmer
 Kelly Sheridan, voice actress
May 31
Phil Devey, baseball player
Greg Leeb, ice hockey player
June 12 - Wade Redden, ice hockey player
June 22 - Chris Wolfenden, volleyball player
June 27 - Kristen Taunton, field hockey player

July to September
July 1 - Jarome Iginla, ice hockey player
July 8 - Sandra Lizé, water polo player
July 19 – Jean-Sébastien Aubin, ice hockey player
July 26 – Tony Sampson, voice and television actor
July 28 – Allan Hawco, actor and producer
August 1 - Marc Denis, ice hockey player
August 14 - Tonya Verbeek, wrestler and Olympic silver medalist
August 15 - Martin Biron, ice hockey player
August 22 – JP Auclair, freeskier. (d. 2014)
August 24 - Murray Grapentine, volleyball player
September 17 - Kim Sarrazin, softball player
September 29 - Wade Brookbank, ice hockey player

October to December
October 3 - Kristy Odamura, softball player
October 6 - Daniel Brière, ice hockey player
October 8 - Viktor Berg, squash player
October 15 - Jen Button, swimmer
October 18 - Paul Stalteri, soccer player
October 27 - Erin White, softball player
October 29 - Matt Higgins, ice hockey player
November 18 - Shahier Razik, squash player
December 13 - Darius Rafat, music producer, composer, bandleader, music agent and entrepreneur
December 16 - Éric Bélanger, ice hockey player
December 27 – Jacqueline Pillon, voice actress
December 29 - Christin Petelski, swimmer

Deaths
January 24 - Jack Bush, painter (b.1909)
February 17 - Edward LeRoy Bowerman, politician (b.1892)
March 14 - Benjamin Chee Chee, artist (b.1944)
May 5 - Stuart Garson, politician, Minister and 12th Premier of Manitoba (b.1898)
June 24 - André-Gilles Fortin, politician (b.1943)
July 3 - Hugh Le Caine, physicist, composer and instrument builder (b.1914)
August - Emanuel Jaques, murder victim (b.1965)
August 14 - Wilfred Curtis, Chief of the Air Staff of the Royal Canadian Air Force (b.1893)
November 3 - William Kurelek, artist and writer (b.1927)
November 5 - Guy Lombardo, bandleader and violinist (b.1902)
November 25 - Tommy Prince, one of Canada's most decorated First Nations soldiers (b.1915)

Full date unknown
Alfred Henry Bence, politician and barrister (b.1908)

See also
 1977 in Canadian television
 List of Canadian films of 1977

References

 
Years of the 20th century in Canada
Canada
1977 in North America